Anónima, is a Colombian television series produced by Sony Pictures Television and Teleset for RCN Televisión. The series stars Verónica Orozco as Victoria  and Juan Esteban Aponte as Eric. The series originally aired from November 17, 2015 to March 8, 2016.

Plot 
The series follows the story of a woman who decides to stay in silence rather than confess their love, a decision that will eventually leave her in prison. After 10 years in prison, he will emerge as a different person, with an exterior hardened and focused on leaving the past behind. Fate, however has other plans and after a tragic turn of events should assume the role of the boy's mother which will take her to the underworld if you want to survive.

Cast 
 Verónica Orozco as Victoria Cuartas 
 Juan Esteban Aponte as Eric
 Julián Arango as Ramiro Rocha
 Sebastián Martínez as Carlos Luna
 Miguel González as Joaquín
 Julio Pachón as Bermúdez
 Jordana Issa as Rincón
 Michelle Manterola as Martha
 Leandro López as Patrullero Montero
 Camila Murcia as Juanita
 Viña Machado as Sofía Linares
 Carlos Serrato as Orlando
 Alex Quiroga as Neyder Vanegas
 Susana Rojas as Yudy Mariño
 Paula Barreto as Betina Serrano
 Manuel Sarmiento as Gonzalo Zapata
 Martín Karpan as Fernando Osorio
 Sebastián Caicedo as Camilo Valderrama
 Fernando de la Pava as Jaime Villanueva
 Sara Pinzón as Victoria Cuartas Almanza
 Tatiana Arango as Jessica Lozano
 Andrés Felipe Martínez as General Ricaurte
 Santiago Alarcón as Maximiliano “Max” Velandia
 Mario Guerrero as Santiago Rocha Pardo
 Wilson Rangel as Rodríguez
 Hector Lucumi as Carlos
 Carolina Cuervo as Susana
 Juliana Galvis as Claudia Pardo de Rocha
 Valentina Gómez as Patricia Triviño
 Isabella García as Martina Velandia Suarez
 Giancarlo Mendoza as Darío Hoyos
 Juan Carlos Arango as Manuel Cáceres
 Natasha Klauss as Adriana
 Jenni Osorio as Ramona

References

External links 
 

Colombian drama television series
Spanish-language television shows
2015 Colombian television series debuts
2016 Colombian television series endings
RCN Televisión original programming
Television shows set in Bogotá